Frozen Evolution is a 2008 book written by parasitologist Jaroslav Flegr, which aims to explain modern developments in evolutionary biology. It also contains information boxes which clarify important topics in science like peer review, scientific journals, citation metrics, philosophy of science, paradigm shifts, and Occam's razor. Flegr's previous research in toxoplasmosis is also mentioned.

The book also discusses Flegr's model of "frozen plasticity," a hypothesis which describes a possible mechanism for the evolution of adaptive traits. This hypothesis proposes that natural selection can only explain adaptation for a limited range of conditions, for instance when populations are genetically homogeneous. He describes frozen plasticity as being more general, and maintains that it better explains the origin of adaptive traits in genetically heterogeneous populations of sexual reproducing organisms. His hypothesis of frozen plasticity is an extension of Niles Eldredge and Stephen Jay Gould's theory of punctuated equilibrium, which describes the history of most fossil species as being relatively stable for millions of years, later punctuated by swift periods of evolutionary change during episodes of speciation. It also draws upon John Maynard Smith's concept of an evolutionarily stable strategy.

Biologist Brian K. Hall described the book as broad and integrative, but also combative, "verging on the disrespectful". Biologist Dan Graur described the book as "sloppily written, unprofessionally translated, inadequately conceived, improperly edited,
dubiously syntaxed, and horribly pompous and tedious stream-of-consciousness monologue masquerading as a scholarly work."

The book was dedicated to the memory of Stephen Jay Gould and John Maynard Smith, "the two most influential evolutionary biologists of the end of the late 20th century".

Reviews
Book review – Brian K. Hall, Evolution & Development
Book review – by Dan Graur, The Quarterly Review of Biology

Notes

External links
 Frozen Evolution - available online

2008 non-fiction books
Books about evolution
Czech books
Extended evolutionary synthesis